The Facel Vega 'Facel II' is a grand touring car produced by French automaker Facel Vega between the years 1962 and 1964.

By 1962, the Paris-based company was facing bankruptcy. The Facel II was to be the company's last attempt to create a luxury GT car in the French tradition. Jean Daninos, president, said of the Facel II, "The HK500 was the most interesting car we ever made but the Facel II was by far the best. It was totally 'elegant' ."

The Facel S.A. company advertised the Facel II as "Le Coupé 4-places le plus rapide du Monde" ('The Fastest 4-seater Coupé in the World'). Sports Car Graphic described it as a "luxurious brute". Bernard Cahier, a race-driver who tested the car in 1962, said of an early version (without the later limited-slip differential) that "the huge output of the Chrysler engine made it easy to spin wheels at light throttle pressure".

Features

The Facel II was introduced at the 1961 Paris Motor Show, and was powered by a Chrysler 6.3 litre (383 cu.in.) Dunlop disc brakes were fitted on all four wheels and Hydrosteer power steering, leather seats, electric windows and radio aerial all became standard during the production run, with Armstrong Selecta-Ride shock-absorbers adjustable from the dash while driving fitted to the right-hand-drive British models. The curvaceous wrap-round dash was in fact metal but meticulously painted to look like wood. Many of the controls were airplane inspired. The later models were fitted with the even more powerful 6.7 litre (413 cu.in.) Chrysler RB "wedge" engine and were faster still.

Like its predecessor, the Facel Vega HK500, the Facel II was a heavy vehicle, weighing  (37 cwt) 'dry' and well over two tons with four passengers and a full petrol tank. There may have been some question about its ride and rear suspension – it used suspension virtually unchanged from the previous HK500 – but certainly none about its speed or glamour.

Contemporary reviews
England's Autocar said of it:

To step down into a Facel II and go motoring must be the ambition of many who can never fulfil it. Such an experience is reserved for the few who can afford to buy one and for their friends and acquaintances.

Said Motor:

There are faster sports cars, although very few, and there are more refined and luxurious saloons, but it is difficult to think of a more remarkable combination of these rather conflicting qualities. ... its unique combination of qualities left the most vivid impression on everyone who drove it. In particular one remembers the smoothness and silence, the effortless gait of a car which does  at only 3,650 rpm. and the acceleration which leaves other fast cars far behind on every straight. One can enjoy the latest refinements of American brute force with European standards of control in an environment of British luxury and French elegance.

Demise
In August 1961 Jean Daninos was obliged to offer his resignation and in 1964 the Facel company went into receivership, largely due to warranty claims against Facel Vega's smaller Facellia with its troublesome 'in-house' engine. As a result, Facel II production had to be discontinued with only 180 Facel IIs ever built.

Owners
The Facel II was very expensive—considerably more expensive than an Aston Martin DB4 and approaching three times the price of an E-type Jaguar;—and highly exclusive. Its looks, rarity, and performance led to famous owners, including Pablo Picasso, Lionel Bart, Lord Brabourne, The Chrysler Corporation (and Mrs Carr, Walter Chrysler's daughter), Joan Collins, Tony Curtis, Christian Dior, Stanley Donen, Charlie Drake, Max Factor Jr, Joan Fontaine, Ava Gardner (who bought three), The Marchioness of Huntly (whose car had full-harness seat-belts), Herbert von Karajan, Danny Kaye, Louis Malle, The President of Mexico, Princess Grace of Monaco, Yves Montand, Hassan II King of Morocco, Baroness Sally Oppenheim-Barnes, William S. Paley, Prince Poniatowski, Anthony Quinn, Debbie Reynolds, Frank Sinatra, Ringo Starr, The Marchioness of Tavistock, François Truffaut, Count Giovanni Volpi di Misurata, Robert Wagner, Sir Mortimer Wheeler, The Shah of Persia and Sihanouk (King-Father of Cambodia). Race drivers Sir Stirling Moss, Maurice Trintignant, Tony Vandervell and Rob Walker and motorcycle racer Arthur Wheeler also had Facels.

Collectibility
Regarded by some today as one of the more handsome automobiles ever made, the remaining Facel IIs are now amongst the most sought-after of all 1960s Grand Tourers. On 1 December 2013 Bonhams in London auctioned the partially restored ex-Ringo Starr right-hand-drive Facel II for £337,500 [= approx €407,000/$552,500 at the time]. On 6 February 2014 Bonhams in Paris auctioned a rusty and derelict 'barn-find' left-hand-drive Facel II in need of a total-rebuild restoration for €155,250 [= approx £129,000/$211,000 at the time]. On 27 June 2014 Bonhams in London auctioned a right-hand-drive 2-owner 'garage-find' non-runner in need of total-rebuild restoration for £122,460 [= approx €154,000/$210,000 at the time]. On 9 September 2017 Bonhams in London auctioned a restored right-hand drive Facel II for £315,100 [= approx €359,000/$428,000 at the time].

References 

Grand tourers
Rear-wheel-drive vehicles
Facel II
Cars introduced in 1962